David Alan Easley (born 1950s) is an American economist. Easley is the Henry Scarborough Professor of Social Science and is a professor of information science at Cornell University.

He was previously an overseas fellow of Churchill College at Cambridge University. His research is in the field of economics, finance and decision theory. In economics, he focuses on learning, wealth dynamics and natural selection in markets. In finance, his work focuses on market microstructure and asset pricing. In decision theory, he works on modeling decision making in complex environments. In networks, he works on network formation and trading networks with colleagues in the computer science department at Cornell.

He is a fellow of the Econometric Society and is a chair of the NASDAQ-OMX economic advisory board.

Several of his scientific papers are listed among the most read in finance, according to the Social Science Research Network

Easley earned his Ph.D. from Northwestern University in 1979.

Notable publications 
The Postal Savings System in the Depression, with Maureen O'Hara, Journal of Economic History, Vol. 39, No. 3, September, 1979.
Stochastic Equilibrium and Optimality with Rolling Plans, with Daniel Spulber, International Economic Review, Vol. 22, No. 1, February, 1981.
Learning to be Rational, with Lawrence Blume, Journal of Economic Theory, Vol. 26, No. 2, April, 1982.
Introduction to the Stability of Rational Expectations Equilibrium, with Lawrence Blume and Margaret Bray, Journal of Economic Theory, Vol. 26, No. 2, April, 1982.
Characterization of Optimal Plans for Stochastic Dynamic Programs, with Lawrence Blume and Maureen O'Hara, Journal of Economic Theory, Vol. 28, No. 2, December, 1982.
Consensus Beliefs Equilibrium and Market Efficiency" with Robert Jarrow, Journal of Finance, Vol. 38, No. 3, June, 1983.
The Economic Role of the Nonprofit Firm, with Maureen O'Hara, Bell Journal of Economics, Autumn, 1983.
Rational Expectations Equilibrium: An Alternative Approach, with Lawrence Blume, Journal of Economic Theory, Vol.34, No. 1, October, 1984.
An Equilibrium Analysis of Optimal Unemployment Insurance and Taxation, with Nicholas M. Kiefer and Uri Possen, Quarterly Journal of Economics, 1985.
Optimal Non-Profit Firms, with Maureen O'Hara, in The Economics of Nonprofit Institutions, S. Rose Ackerman (editor), Oxford University Press, 1986.
Preying for Time, with R. T. Masson and R. J. Reynolds, Journal of Industrial Economics, 1985. (Reprinted in Oligopoly, Competition and Welfare, Basil Blackwell Ltd.,1985).
Contracts and Asymmetric Information in the Theory of the Firm, with Maureen O'Hara, Journal of Economic Behavior and Organization, 9, 1988.
Price, Trade Size, and Information in Securities Markets, with Maureen O'Hara, Journal of Financial Economics, 19, 1987.
Controlling a Stochastic Process with Unknown Parameters, with Nicholas M. Kiefer, Econometrica, Vol. 56, No. 5, September, 1988.
Optimal Learning with Endogenous Data, with Nicholas M. Kiefer, International Economic Review, Vol. 30, No. 4, 1989.
Implementation of Walrasian Expectations Equilibria, with Lawrence Blume, Journal of Economic Theory, Vol. 51, No. 1, 1990.
Order Form and Information in Securities Markets, with Maureen O'Hara, Journal of Finance, Vol. 46, No. 3, 1991.
Adverse Selection and Large Trade Volume: The Implications for Market Efficiency, with Maureen O'Hara, Journal of Financial and Quantitative Analysis, Vol. 27, No. 2, June 1992.
Time and the Process of Security Price Adjustment, with Maureen O'Hara, Journal of Finance, Vol. XLVII, No. 2, June 1992.
Evolution and Market Behavior, with Lawrence Blume, Journal of Economic Theory, Vol. 58, No. 1, 1992.
Theories of Price Formation and Exchange in Double Oral Auctions, with John Ledyard, in The Double Auction Market: Institutions, Theories and Evidence, D. Friedman and J. Rust, eds., Santa Fe Institute Studies in the Sciences of Complexity, Proceedings, Volume XV, Addison Wesley, 1993.
Economic Natural Selection, with Lawrence Blume, in Symposium on Evolution, Economics Letters, 42, 1993.
An Equilibrium Analysis of Fiscal Policy with Uncertainty and Incomplete Markets, with Nicholas Kiefer and Uri Possen, International Economic Review, Vol. 34, No. 4, November 1993.
Market Statistics and Technical Analysis: The Role of Volume, with Lawrence Blume and Maureen O'Hara, Journal of Finance, Vol. XLIX, No. 1, March 1994.
What Has the Rational Learning Literature Taught Us, with Lawrence Blume, in Essays in Learning and Rationality in Economics, A. Kirman and M. Salmon eds., Basil Blackwell Press, 1995.
Evolution and Rationality in Competitive Markets, with Lawrence Blume, in Essays in Learning and Rationality in Economics, A. Kirman and M. Salmon eds., Basil Blackwell Press, 1995.
Market Microstructure, with Maureen O'Hara, in Handbooks in Operations Research and Management Science: Finance, R. Jarrow, V. Maksimovic and W. Ziemba, eds., North Holland, 1995.
Cream-Skimming or Profit-Sharing? The Curious Role of Purchased Order Flow, with Nicholas M. Kiefer and Maureen O'Hara, Journal of Finance, Vol. 51, No. 3, July 1996.
Liquidity, Information and Infrequently Traded Stocks, with Nicholas Kiefer, Maureen O'Hara, and Joseph Paperman, Journal of Finance, Vol. 51, No. 4, September 1996.
The Information Content of the Trading Process, with Nicholas Kiefer and Maureen O'Hara, Journal of Empirical Finance, Vol. 4, No. 2-3, June 1997.
One Day in the Life of a Common Stock, with Nicholas Kiefer and Maureen O'Hara, Review of Financial Studies, Vol. 10, No. 3, Fall 1997.
Option Volume and Stock Prices: Evidence on where Informed Traders Trade, with Maureen O'Hara and P. S. Srinivas, Journal of Finance, Vol. 53, No. 2, April 1998.
Rational Expectations and Rational Learning, with Lawrence Blume, in Organizations with Incomplete Information, volume in honor of Roy Radner, ed. M. Majumdar, Cambridge University Press, 1998.
Financial Analysts and Information-Based Trade, with Maureen O'Hara and Joseph Paperman, Journal of Financial Markets, Vol. 1, 1998.
Choice Without Beliefs, with Aldo Rustichini, Econometrica. Vol. 67, No. 5, September 1999.
How Stock Splits Affect Trading: A Microstructure Approach, with Maureen O'Hara and Gideon Saar, Journal of Financial and Quantitative Analysis, Vol. 36, 2001.
Is Information Risk A Determinant of Asset Prices? with Soeren Hvidjaer and Maureen O'Hara, Journal of Finance, Vol. 57, No. 1, October 2002.
Optimality and Natural Selection in Markets, with Lawrence Blume, Journal of Economic Theory, Vol. 107, No. 1, November 2002.
Asset Pricing and Market Microstructure, with Maureen O'Hara, in Handbook of the Economics of Finance, Elsevier Scientific Press, 2003.
Information and the Cost of Capital, with Maureen O'Hara, Journal of Finance, Vol. 59, No. 4, August, 2004.
Optimal Guessing in Complex Environments, with Aldo Rustichini, Journal of Economic Theory, Vol. 124, No. 1, September 2005.
Rationality and Selection in Asset Markets, with Lawrence Blume, Santa Fe Institute Volume in honor of Kenneth Arrow: The Economy as an Evolving Complex System, 2005.
If You're So Smart, Why Aren't You Rich: Belief Selection in Complete and Incomplete Markets, with Lawrence Blume, Econometrica, Vol. 74, No. 4, July 2006.
Information, Trade and Incomplete Markets, with Lawrence Blume and Tarek Coury, Economic Theory, Vol. 29, No. 2, October, 2006.
Redoing the Foundations of Decision Theory, with Lawrence Blume and Joseph Halpern, Tenth International Conference on Principles of Knowledge Representation and Reasoning (KR2006), 2006.
Trading Networks with Price-Setting Agents, with Lawrence Blume, Jon Kleinberg and Eva Tardos, Eighth ACM Conference on Electronic Commerce (EC2007), 2007.
A new start: Innovative introductory AI-centered courses at Cornell, with E. Breck, D. Fan, J. Kleinberg, L. Lee, J. Wofford, R. Zabih, Proc. AAAI Spring Symposium, 2008.
Time Varying Arrival Rates of Informed and Uninformed Traders, with Robert Engle, Maureen O'Hara and Liuren Wu, Journal of Financial Econometrics, 6, 171 - 207, Spring 2008.
Rationality, with Lawrence Blume, in The New Palgrave Dictionary of Economics 2nd Edition, Palgrave Macmillan, 2008.
Market Competition and Selection, with Lawrence Blume, in The New Palgrave Dictionary of Economics 2nd Edition, Palgrave Macmillan, 2008.
Market Selection and Asset Pricing, with Lawrence Blume, in Handbook of Financial Markets: Dynamics and Evolution, Thorsten Hens and Klaus-Schenk Hoppe, eds., Elsevier, January 2009.
The Market Organism: Long Run Survival in Markets with Heterogeneous Traders, with Lawrence Blume, Journal of Economic Dynamics and Control, Vol 33, Issue 5, 1023-1035, May 2009.
Ambiguity and Nonparticipation: The Role of Regulation, with Maureen O'Hara, Review of Financial Studies, 22, 1817 - 1843, May 2009.
Trading Networks with Price-Setting Agents, with Lawrence Blume, Jon Kleinberg and Eva Tardos, Games and Economic Behavior, 67, 36-50, September 2009.
Liquidity and Valuation in an Uncertain World, with Maureen O'Hara, Journal of Financial Economics, 97, 1-12, July 2010.
Microstructure and Ambiguity, with Maureen O'Hara, Journal of Finance, 65, 1817-1846, 2010.
Factoring Information into Returns, with Soeren Hvidkjaer and Maureen O'Hara, Journal of Financial and Quantitative Analysis, 45, 293-309, 2010.
The Microstructure of the “Flash Crash”: Flow Toxicity, Liquidity Crashes, and the Probability of Informed Trading, with Marcos Lopez de Prado and Maureen O'Hara, Journal of Portfolio Management, Winter, 2011.
The Exchange of Flow Toxicity, with Marcos Lopez de Prado and Maureen O'Hara, Journal of Trading, Spring, 2011.
Network Formation in the Presence of Contagious Risk, with Lawrence Blume, Jon Kleinberg, Robert Kleinberg and Eva Tardos, forthcoming, ACM Conference on Electronic Commerce (EC2011), 2011.
 
The Characteristics of Informed Trading: Implications for Asset Pricing, with Hadiye Aslan, Soeren Hvidkjaer and Maureen O'Hara, Journal of Empirical Finance, 18, 5, 782-801, 2011.
Which Networks Are Least Susceptible to Cascading Failures?, with Lawrence Blume, Jon Kleinberg, Robert Kleinberg, Eva Tardos, Proc. 52nd IEEE Symposium on Foundations of Computer Science, 2011.
Flow Toxicity and Volatility in a High Frequency World, with Marcos Lopez de Prado and Maureen O'Hara, Review of Financial Studies, 25, 5, 1457–93, 2012.
The Volume Clock: Insights into the High Frequency Paradigm," with Marcos Lopez de Prado and Maureen O'Hara, Journal of Portfolio ManagementVol. 39, No. 1: pp. 19–29, Fall 2012.
Network Formation in the Presence of Contagious Risk, with Lawrence Blume, Jon Kleinberg, Robert Kleinberg and Eva Tardos, ACM Transactions on Economics and Computation, 1, 2, 6:1-6:20, May 2013.
Incentives, Gamification, and Game Theory: An Economic Approach to Badge Design, with Arpita Ghosh, Proceedings of the fourteenth ACM Conference on Electronic Commerce, 359-376, 2013.
Levelling the Trading Field, with Terry Hendershott and Tarun Ramadorai, Journal of Financial Markets, 17, 65-93, 2014.
VPIN and the Flash Crash: A Rejoinder, with Marcos Lopez de Prado and Maureen O'Hara, Journal of Financial Markets, 17, 47-52, 2014.
Opaque Trading, Disclosure and Asset Prices: Implications for Hedge Fund Regulation,	with Maureen O'Hara and Liyan Yang, Review of Financial Studies, 27 (4), 1190-1237, 2014.
Introduction to Computer Science and Economic Theory, with Lawrence Blume, Jon	Kleinberg, Robert Kleinberg and Eva Tardos, Journal of Economic Theory, 156, 1-13, 2015.
Behavioral Mechanism Design: Optimal Crowdsourcing Contracts and Prospect Theory, with Arpita Ghosh, Proceedings of the fifteenth ACM Conference on Economics and Computation, EC'15
Optimal Execution Horizon, with Marcos Lopez de Prado and Maureen O'Hara, Mathematical Finance, 25, 640-672, 2015.
Loss Aversion, Survival and Asset Prices, with Liyan Yang, Journal of Economic Theory, 160, 494-516, 2015.
Introduction to the Special Issue on EC'14, with Vince Conitzer, ACM Transactions on Economics and Computation, 4 (4), 2016.
Incentives, Gamification, and Game Theory: An Economic Approach to Badge Design, with Arpita Ghosh, Proceedings of the fourteenth ACM Conference on Electronic Commerce, 359-376, 2013; and in ACM Transactions on Economics and Computation, 4(3), 2016.
Differential Access to Price Information in Financial Markets, with Maureen O'Hara and Liyan Yang, Journal of Financial and Quantitative Analysis, 51.4, 1071-111, 2016.
Discerning Information from Trade Date, with Marcos Lopez de Prado and Maureen O'Hara, Journal of Financial Economics, 20.2 , 269-285, 2016.

References

External links 

 

Fellows of the Econometric Society
Econometric Society, Fellows of the
1950s births
Living people
21st-century American economists
American economics writers
American male non-fiction writers
Cornell University faculty
Kellogg School of Management alumni
Academic journal editors
Financial economists